Louis Pounders is an American architect in Memphis, Tennessee. He is a Fellow (FAIA) at the American Institute of Architects. He has worked with Askew Nixon Ferguson Architects. Pounders graduated from Rhodes College and received a Master of Architecture from Harvard Graduate School of Design. Pounders chaired the National AIA Committee on Design in 2009, the only Tennessee architect to have held the position. He co-authored A Survey of Modern Public Buildings in Memphis, Tennessee from 1940 to 1980. He designed his own home in 1996.

Work
Metropolitan Interfaith Association (MIFA) 
Tunica RiverPark in Mississippi
Alex Haley Interpretive Center in Henning 
"On the Rocks" weekend house in Arkansas

References

Living people
Harvard Graduate School of Design alumni
Rhodes College alumni
Architects from Tennessee
Year of birth missing (living people)
20th-century American architects
21st-century American architects